Francis "Frank" Fee (born 14 May 1934 in Belfast, Northern Ireland) is a former Irish cricketer.

A right-handed batsman and right-arm medium-pace and off-spin bowler, he made his debut for the Ireland cricket team against Sussex in August 1956, and went on to play for them on 13 occasions, his last match coming against Leicestershire in August 1959.

Of his matches for Ireland, five had first-class status. In all matches, he scored 132 runs at an average of 8.25, with a top score of 31 against New Zealand in July 1958. He took 58 wickets at an average of 12.57, with best bowling figures of 9/26 against Scotland in July 1957.

His figures of 9/26 against Scotland are the best innings bowling figures for Ireland where the number of runs conceded is known. It is one of only four occasions in which an Irish bowler has taken nine wickets in an innings, and one of only two occasions it has been done for Ireland in first-class cricket. His first-class bowling average of 9.62 is the best for Ireland in first-class cricket.

He worked as a schoolteacher and educational psychologist.

References

1934 births
Living people
Irish cricketers
Cricketers from Belfast
Cricketers from Northern Ireland